The Fish Creek Mountains are a mountain range in Imperial County, California.

References 

Mountain ranges of the Colorado Desert
Mountain ranges of the Lower Colorado River Valley
Mountain ranges of Imperial County, California